Granuliterebra eddunhami is a species of sea snail, a marine gastropod mollusk in the family Terebridae, the auger snails.

Description
The length of the shell attains 9.6 mm.

Distribution
This species occurs in the Indian Ocean off Mozambique.

References

 Terryn, Y. (2007). Terebridae: A Collectors Guide. Conchbooks & Natural Art. 59pp + plates.
 Terryn Y. & Holford M. (2008) The Terebridae of Vanuatu with a revision of the genus Granuliterebra, Oyama 1961. Visaya Supplement 3: 1-96.

Terebridae
Gastropods described in 2008